Leucocharis pancheri is a species of air-breathing land snails, terrestrial pulmonate gastropod mollusks in the family Bothriembryontidae.

Description
The length of the shell attains 31.9 mm.

Distribution
This species is endemic to New Caledonia.

References

 Crosse, H., 1871. Description d'espèces inédites provenant de la Nouvelle-Calédonie.. Journal de Conchyliologie "1870"18: 403-420
 Breure, A. S. H., 1976. Types of Bulimulidae (Mollusca, Gastropoda) in the Muséum national d'Histoire naturelle, Paris. Bulletin du Muséum national d'Histoire naturelle 233 "1975": 1137-1187, sér. ser.3, part. Zoologie

External links
 
 Crosse H. (1870). Diagnoses Molluscorum Novae Caledoniae incolarum. Journal de Conchyliologie. 18(1): 136-138
 Franc A. (1957). Mollusques terrestres et fluviatiles de l'archipel néo-calédonien. Mémoires du Muséum National d'Histoire Naturelle de Paris. ser. A (Zoologie), 13: 1-200, 24 pls.
 Barker, G. M.; Brodie, G.; Bogitini, L.; Pippard, H. (2016). Diversity and current conservation status of Melanesian–New Zealand placostyline land snails (Gastropoda : Bothriembryontidae), with discussion of conservation imperatives, priorities and methodology issues. Pacific Conservation Biology. 22(3): 203

pancheri
Endemic fauna of New Caledonia
Taxonomy articles created by Polbot
Taxobox binomials not recognized by IUCN